The Gorilla of Soho is 1968 West German crime film directed by Harald Philipp and starring Horst Tappert, Uschi Glas and Uwe Friedrichsen. It was part of Rialto Film's long-running series of Edgar Wallace adaptations.

It was shot on location around London and at the Spandau Studios in Berlin. The film's sets were designed by the art directors Walter Kutz and Wilhelm Vorwerg.

Cast
 Horst Tappert as Insp. David Perkins
 Uschi Glas as Susan McPherson
 Uwe Friedrichsen as Dr. Hermitage  
 Hubert von Meyerinck as Sir Arthur
 Herbert Fux as Mr. Sugar
 Inge Langen as Mother Superior / Oberin
 Beate Hasenau as Cora Watson
 Albert Lieven as Henry Parker
 Ilse Pagé as Miss Finley
 Hilde Sessak as Sister Elizabeth
 Ralf Schermuly as Edgar Bird
 Maria Litto as Gloria
 Claus Holm as Dr. Jeckyll
 Ingrid Back as Patsy
 Franz-Otto Krüger as Police Doctor
 Eric Vaessen as Gordon Stuart
 Catana Cayetano as Dorothy Smith
 Heidrun Hankammer as Mädchen im Heim
 Käthe Jöken-König as Susan's Mother
 Uschi Mood as Aktmodell
 Ingrid Steeger as Waitress
 Reinhold Timm as Zeichner
 Alfred Vohrer as Edgar Wallace
 Bernd Wilczewski as Muskelmodell

References

Bibliography

External links 
 

1968 films
1960s mystery thriller films
German mystery thriller films
West German films
1960s German-language films
Films directed by Alfred Vohrer
Constantin Film films
Films set in London
Films shot in London
Films based on British novels
Films based on works by Edgar Wallace
Films shot at Spandau Studios
1960s German films